Pomperaug High School (PHS) is a public high school in Southbury, Connecticut. It is part of Regional School District 15 which serves Southbury in addition to Middlebury.

History
Pomperaug was built in 1979 on the border between Southbury and Middlebury, the two communities which it serves. It is the only high school in Regional School District 15, and receives students who have graduated from Memorial Middle School (in Middlebury) and Rochambeau Middle School (in Southbury). Previous to the building of Pomperaug High School, the region was served by Southbury High School, the now current Rochambeau Middle School building.

On August 1, 2018, it was announced that Paul Jones would be the new principal of Pomperaug High School, filling the position that was previously held by Glenn Lungarini.

Academics
In 2022, PHS was ranked #27 in U.S. News Best High Schools in Connecticut.

Athletics 
Pomperaug also has a strong athletic tradition with a number of championships. The school is a part of the South West Conference.

State championships

 Boys' Swimming: 1991, 1994, 1995, 1996, 1999, 2000, 2007, 2008, 2008, 2009, 2010, 2010, 2011, 2012, 2013, 2014, 2015, 2016, 2019
 Field Hockey: 1981, 1989, 1996, 1998, 1999, 2000, 2002, 2003, 2010
 Football: 2004
 Boys' Track: 1999
 Golf: 1998, 1999 2013
 Boys' Cross Country: 1993, 1997
 Boys' Basketball: 1980
 Girls' Cross Country: 1988, 1989, 2010
 Softball: 1975
 Gymnastics: 2002, 2004, 2008
 Girls' Swimming: 2009, 2013, 2022
 Baseball: 2010
 Ice Hockey: 2011
 Boys Soccer: 2011, ranked #7 in the Nation according to NSCAA (National Soccer Coaches of America Association)

Notable alumni

 Shane Bannon (2007), drafted to the Kansas City Chiefs
 James Ledbetter (1982), author and editor based in New York City
 Mark W. Libby (1988), United States diplomat
 John Pullman "Jake" Longstreth, Jr. (1995), American painter, musician, and internet radio personality
 Jimmy “Jomboy” O’Brien (2007), founder and content creators at Jomboy Media, a sports entertainment company
 Katie Stevens (2010), from the ninth season of American Idol

References

Educational institutions established in 1979
Schools in New Haven County, Connecticut
Middlebury, Connecticut
Southbury, Connecticut
Public high schools in Connecticut
1979 establishments in Connecticut